Alishan Township is a mountain indigenous township in Chiayi County, Taiwan. The Alishan National Scenic Area covers most, but not all, of the township and also parts of neighboring townships.

History
Alishan is traditional territory of the headhunting Tsou people, whose rich oral histories describe the migrations of each ancient clans' ancestors into the area between Yushan and the Chianan Plain. Originally, each clan had its own settlement, with the first multi-clan town, Tfuya, only forming approximately 1600 CE. The earliest written record of the Tsou dates from the Dutch occupation, which describes Tfuya as having approximately 300 people in 1647. Ethnologists have attempted to reconstruct the development of Tfuya, proposing that each stage of clan migration could be equivalent to three or four generations of family. 

The Alishan area was originally settled by the Tsou tribe of the Taiwanese aborigines; the name derives from the aboriginal word Jarissang. From 1920 to 1945, the area was classified as Savage Land under Kagi District, Tainan Prefecture. After 1945, the area was named Wufong Township (吳鳳鄉), after Chinese merchant Wu Feng, but was renamed to Alishan Township in March 1989.

Geography
It has a population total of 5,374 and an area of 427.8471 square kilometres.

Climate
Alishan has a subtropical highland climate (Köppen: Cwb) with extremely wet and mild conditions during the monsoon season when the town receives  of rain in five months, and cool and drier conditions during the winter months. Temperatures remain relatively constant throughout the year, with only noticeably cooler temperatures during the winter months of December to February of the following year.

Administrative divisions

The township comprises 12 villages: Chashan, Dabang, Fongshan, Laiji, Leye, Lijia, Shanmei, Shihzih, Sianglin, Sinmei, Jhongshan and Jhongjheng.

Tourist attractions
Alishan is the main base for trekkers in the highlands of Taiwan and for mountain climbers aiming to scale Yu Shan, Taiwan's highest peak and the highest and sole formerly glaciated point on the Tropic of Cancer. Chu Shan, though lower, is more accessible and climbed by most visitors to the region, which is extremely popular with Taiwanese tourists. The highland region in which Alishan is situated also contains a number of notable rock formations from the continuing uplift of the island. Jiao Lung Waterfall, Taiwan's tallest waterfall, is located within the township. YuYuPas Tsou cultural tribe park showcases the culture of the Tsou.

Transportation

Alishan township is accessible from Duolin Station, Shizilu Station, Pingzhena Station, Erwanping Station, Shenmu Station, Alishan Station and Zhaoping Station of the Alishan Forest Railway.

Notable natives
 Francesca Kao, actress, singer and television host
 Shih Chih-wei, baseball player

References

External links

 Alishan Natiaonl Scenic Area

Townships in Chiayi County